Harri Heliövaara and Emil Ruusuvuori were the defending champions but chose not to defend their title.

Filip Horanský and Sergiy Stakhovsky won the title after defeating Denys Molchanov and Aleksandr Nedovyesov 6–4, 6–4 in the final.

Seeds

Draw

References

 Main draw

Slovak Open II - Doubles
2021 Doubles